Kevin Mark Phillips (born 25 July 1973) is an English former professional footballer who is currently manager of NPL Premier Division club South Shields.

A former forward, Phillips was the Premier League top scorer in the 1999–2000 season with 30 goals for Sunderland, a tally which won him the European Golden Shoe. He remains the only Englishman to win the trophy. He also had spells at Watford, Southampton, Aston Villa, West Bromwich Albion, Birmingham City, Blackpool, Crystal Palace, and Leicester City.

Club career

Early career
Phillips was born in Hitchin, Hertfordshire. He started his footballing career as a trainee with Southampton, where he spent six years, four as a schoolboy, before being taken on as an apprentice in 1989. As a youth, Phillips was considered to be too small to play up front and was played at right back, in which position he made two reserve team appearances in 1990. He failed to make the grade at Southampton and was released by manager Chris Nicholl, and returned to Hertfordshire where he signed for non-League semi-professional side Baldock Town in the summer of 1991.

At Baldock Town, he was initially played as a defender until an injury crisis resulted in manager Ian Allinson playing Phillips as a striker, scoring twice in his first match in his new role. He was signed by Watford in December 1994 for an initial £10,000, plus four additional payments of £5,000.

Watford
Phillips established himself in the squad during the second half of the 1994–95 season, and played regularly before suffering a foot injury in March 1996, initially diagnosed as a hairline fracture and later discovered to be a hole in a ligament in his foot, that kept him out for a year. Watford were relegated from Division One in 1995–96, and by the time Phillips returned to the team, they were in the top half of Division Two, and went on to finish 13th. In July 1997, Phillips signed for Sunderland for a fee of £325,000, potentially rising to more than £600,000.

Sunderland
Phillips signed for Sunderland just after their relegation from the Premiership. Fifteen matches into the Division One season, the club were in mid-table and Phillips had four goals. In the remainder of the season, Phillips set or equalled club records by scoring in seven consecutive matches and in nine consecutive home matches, became the first Sunderland player since Brian Clough in 1961–62 to score 30 goals in a season, and finished the campaign with 35 goals in all competitions, the most by any Sunderland player in one season since the Second World War. His tally included a four-goal haul in the third round of the FA Cup at Rotherham United and two goals in the play-off campaign. After scoring Sunderland's second goal in the play-off final, Phillips was substituted after 73 minutes with an injury, so missed the remainder of the 4–4 draw with Charlton Athletic which Sunderland lost 7–6 on penalties. Phillips later described the final as his "most disappointing day in football", but also as the best match he had ever played in.

Phillips scored eight goals in the opening weeks of the 1998–99 season as Sunderland reached the top of the Division One table. A broken toe sustained in a League Cup tie against Chester City in mid-September kept him out for nearly four months, but his goalscoring resumed immediately upon his return, with a "screaming volley" away to Queens Park Rangers. Promotion was confirmed in April as Phillips scored four of Sunderland's five goals in an away game against Bury, and he ended the season with 23 goals from only 26 league games, and 25 goals in all competitions. His form earned him an international call-up for England, and he made his debut in the starting eleven in a friendly against Hungary.

In the run-up to the start of the 1999–2000 FA Premier League season, pundit Rodney Marsh predicted that Phillips would struggle to get more than five or six goals at the higher level. Forming a potent "little and large" strike pairing with veteran target-man Niall Quinn, Phillips scored his sixth goal on 18 September – the first of a hat-trick against Derby County – and was named Premier League Player of the Month for October. His goal tally was 20 by mid-January and 30 by the season's end, a total that earned him not only the Premier League Golden Boot but also the European Golden Shoe award – , he remains the only Englishman to have won the latter – and with a 14-goal return from Quinn contributed to Sunderland's seventh-place finish, just missing out on a UEFA Cup place.

In January 2001, Phillips scored his 104th goal for Sunderland, breaking the club's post-war goalscoring record. As the season wore on, Phillips suffered both a lack of form and disciplinary problems: he scored only once between mid-January and May, and came in for criticism from fans and local press. He finished the season with 18 goals in all competitions, 14 in the league, as Sunderland again finished seventh and missed out on UEFA Cup qualification.

Phillips' goals contribution to Sunderland's 2001–02 season fell to 13, of which 11 came in the league. He relinquished his penalty-taking duties, after three consecutive spot-kicks were saved, but his goal on the final day of the season, in a 1–1 draw with Derby County, was enough to ensure 17th place and Premier League survival. He played the last months of the campaign despite a groin problem which required surgery over the 2002 close season.

Amid interest from clubs including Arsenal and Tottenham Hotspur, Phillips "pledged his future" to Sunderland ahead of the 2002–03 season, though he later confirmed he had submitted a transfer request in August. Manager Peter Reid brought in strikers Tore André Flo and Marcus Stewart, and warned Phillips he was no longer an automatic first choice. Phillips in fact started 32 of the 38 league matches, but scored only 6 goals as the club were relegated with just four wins and what were then Premier League record lows of 19 points and 21 goals. A second transfer request was rejected in January, but at the end of the season Phillips confirmed that the club's need to reduce its expenditure in light of relegation meant that he would be leaving. He had played in 235 matches for Sunderland, and scored 130 goals at an average of better than a goal every two games.

Southampton
In August 2003, following Sunderland's relegation from the Premier League, Phillips moved to the south coast to join Southampton for a fee of £3.25 million, with Phillips signing a four-year contract, while taking a substantial cut in his salary.

He made his debut on 16 August, coming on as a substitute away to Leicester City and scoring with a long-range strike in a 2–2 draw. His next goal came at White Hart Lane on 20 September when the ball ricocheted in off him from an attempted clearance by Tottenham Hotspur's Anthony Gardner. This was followed in mid-week by the equalising goal in a 1–1 draw with Steaua Bucharest in the UEFA Cup First round. On the following Saturday, Phillips was sent off in the final minute of a bad-tempered 1–0 defeat to Middlesbrough, after he kicked out at Boro defender Franck Queudrue.

Phillips then failed to score for over three months until his fourth goal of the season came in a 2–1 victory over Leeds United on 17 January 2004. There then followed a rich run of form with Phillips netting ten further goals in the final four months of the season including two goals in the matches at Manchester United, Wolverhampton Wanderers and Manchester City. Phillips ended the 2003–04 season with 13 goals in total, from 37 appearances.

In March 2004, manager Gordon Strachan had resigned to be replaced by Paul Sturrock who was dismissed shortly after the start of the 2004–05 season, to be replaced in turn by Steve Wigley who spent just three months in charge before the arrival of Harry Redknapp from local rivals Portsmouth in December. Phillips had now played under four managers within a year.

Despite the frequent changes in manager, Phillips continued to score regularly in his partnership with new signing Peter Crouch. He managed ten league goals in 2004–05, including two in a 3–3 draw with Fulham on 5 January. Despite Phillips's goals, the club finished at the bottom of the table and were relegated after 27 years in the top flight. On 29 June 2005, Phillips departed from Southampton after two years and 22 league goals to join Aston Villa in a £1 million deal.

Aston Villa
Phillips signed a two-year contract with Premier League club Aston Villa for a fee of £1 million on 29 June 2005. He scored just four minutes into his Villa debut, and then returned from injury to seal Villa's first Premier League defeat of local rivals Birmingham City in seven attempts. Phillips shared front-man duties with Juan Pablo Ángel and fellow new signing Milan Baroš, but illness and further injuries disrupted his season, in which he contributed only five goals. He began the 2006–07 season with Villa, but on 22 August, he signed for West Bromwich Albion of the Championship for a £700,000 fee.

West Bromwich Albion

Phillips joined West Bromwich Albion despite strong interest from Sunderland, where his former strike partner Niall Quinn had recently become both chairman and manager. He cited a reluctance to move his family and home for a third time in three years as a major factor in his decision. He scored 22 goals in his first season with West Brom, including two hat-tricks, one in a 5–1 win at Ipswich Town and the second in a 7–0 defeat of Barnsley on the final day of the regular season that confirmed Albion's place in the play-offs. Phillips scored twice in the first leg of the play-off semi-final against Wolverhampton Wanderers, and headed the only goal of the second leg to ensure their progression to the final, in which they lost 1–0 to Derby County.

He missed six weeks of the 2007–08 season because of a knee injury sustained in early November, but rediscovered his goalscoring form on his return to win the Championship player-of-the-month award for December. Described by Albion manager Tony Mowbray as "a natural goal-scorer with great awareness and vision", Phillips scored his 200th League goal in a 1–1 draw with Crystal Palace on 13 March 2008. For the last match of the season, away to Queens Park Rangers, fans of West Bromwich Albion chose to dress up as superheroes in honour of Phillips, who is nicknamed "Super Kev"; Albion won the match 2–0 to win promotion to the Premier League as champions. Phillips won numerous awards over the season. He received Player-of-the-Year awards from both the West Bromwich Albion Supporters Club and from the club itself, after scoring 24 goals from 30 starts and finishing as the Championship's second top goalscorer. At national level, he was chosen Championship Player of the Year at the annual Football League Awards, ahead of Andy Gray of Charlton Athletic and Michael Kightly of Wolverhampton Wanderers, and, together with teammates Paul Robinson and Jonathan Greening, was named in the PFA Championship Team of the Year.

Birmingham City
When his contract with West Bromwich Albion expired at the end of the 2007–08 season, the club offered Phillips a one-year deal, with an additional second year if he made 19 or more league appearances. He rejected the offer, preferring to sign a two-year contract with Birmingham City, newly relegated from the Premier League. He made his debut on the opening day of the 2008–09 season against Sheffield United, coming on as a substitute to score a stoppage time winner in a 1–0 victory. Phillips continued his scoring run with goals in his next two games, against Southampton and Barnsley, "lashed in a stinging low drive" against Reading that earned him the club's Goal of the Season award, and finished the season with 14 goals in all competitions. His 14th, to take a two-goal lead in a 2–1 win against promotion rivals Reading on the last day of the season, ensured Birmingham's return to the Premier League after just one season in the Championship.

At 36, Phillips recognised he would play a reduced role at the higher level. In a season when manager Alex McLeish relied on consistency in team selection – Birmingham set a Premier League record of nine consecutive matches with the same starting eleven, and a club record twelve-match unbeaten run in the top flight – he started only twice, but came on as substitute in 17 games. He scored only four goals, but those goals contributed four points to the club's highest finish for more than 50 years. Against Wolverhampton Wanderers, he came off the bench to score twice in the last ten minutes and win the game, and on 27 March 2010, 1–0 down at home to Arsenal, a 92nd-minute clearance by Bacary Sagna deflected off Phillips' face via the goalkeeper into the net for his 250th career goal.

He signed a one-year contract extension ahead of the 2010–11 season, but missed the start through injury. He went on to make five league starts, but his major contribution came in the League Cup. Facing League One club Brentford, Phillips scored a stoppage-time equaliser and converted his penalty in the shootout by which Birmingham progressed to the quarter-final. They went on to reach the final, where Phillips received his first winners' medal in a cup competition, albeit as an unused substitute, as Birmingham defeated favourites Arsenal 2–1. Birmingham finished 18th in the League, so were relegated to the Championship, and Phillips was one of several players to leave the club when their contracts expired at the end of the season.

Blackpool
On 10 July 2011, Phillips signed a one-year deal with Football League Championship club Blackpool. On 14 August, he scored both of Blackpool's goals in their 2–1 league victory over Peterborough United, on his home debut. He again scored twice a few days later, including a last-minute equaliser, in a 2–2 draw away at Brighton & Hove Albion. On 5 November, Phillips scored the only goal of the game against Millwall within three minutes of coming on as a substitute. In a five-game spell in January and February 2012, he came off the bench to score late equalising goals in three league matches, two of which Blackpool went on to win, and, in his first start for three months, converted a 93rd-minute penalty against Sheffield Wednesday in the fourth round of the FA Cup to force a replay. Phillips finished the season as the club's top scorer, with 17 goals in all competitions, and won their goal of the season for his equaliser against Cardiff City, described in The Observer as "a lovely lob punishing [goalkeeper] David Marshall for a punched clearance that lacked the required distance. Phillips took the ball down on his chest, picked his spot and scored with consummate skill and accuracy".

Phillips took up the option to extend his Blackpool contract for a further year, but scored only twice from 18 appearances before following manager Ian Holloway to Championship rivals Crystal Palace.

Crystal Palace
On the last day of the January 2013 transfer window, Phillips signed on loan to Crystal Palace until the end of the 2012–13 season. He made his debut as a half-time substitute in the 2–1 win at home to Charlton Athletic, after being 1–0 down prior to his introduction, and scored his first goal for the Eagles in their next game, against his former club Watford at Vicarage Road. Palace were again trailing when he came off the bench, 2–0 down with half an hour remaining, and Phillips scored the equaliser as the side fought back to achieve a 2–2 draw. Phillips' hat-trick, scored in eight minutes either side of half-time in a 4–2 defeat of Hull City, made him the oldest scorer in Palace's history at 39 years 7 months. This is also the club's fastest ever hat-trick in the league, beating the previous record set by Dougie Freedman in 11 minutes in a 5–0 win against Grimsby Town exactly 17 years before. On 27 May, he came on as a substitute in the play-off final and converted an extra-time penalty to secure Palace's promotion to the Premier League at the expense of former club Watford. Steve Parish indicated in the Croydon Advertiser that Phillips had agreed to a one-year deal with Palace in July 2013.

Crystal Palace confirmed on 20 July 2013 that Phillips had joined the club on a one-year deal.

On 31 December 2013, Crystal Palace confirmed that Phillips would leave the club by mutual consent in January.

Leicester City
On 15 January 2014, Leicester City confirmed that they had signed Phillips on a short-term contract until the end of the season. The striker made his debut on 18 January 2014 against Leeds United, coming on as a substitute for Jamie Vardy, helping create the opportunity that saw fellow former England international David Nugent score the winning goal of the game. On 1 February 2014, Phillips scored his first goal for the club against AFC Bournemouth, heading in winger Anthony Knockaert's cross. Phillips' second goal for Leicester, his first at home, came in the 3–1 victory over former club Blackpool on 15 March 2014. On 28 April 2014, he announced his intention to retire from football at the conclusion of the 2013–14 season. With Leicester already confirmed as champions, Phillips played his final career game in the last match of the season, against Doncaster Rovers on 3 May 2014, and was substituted in the 65th minute.

Coaching career

Leicester City
Following his retirement from football, Phillips was offered a coaching role and remained at Leicester City as assistant first team coach for the club's first season back in the Premier League.

Derby County
On 17 September 2015, Phillips was appointed as assistant coach to Paul Clement at Derby County.

Stoke City
In June 2018 Phillips joined as first-team coach to Gary Rowett at Stoke City. He left Stoke on 8 January 2019.

South Shields
On 16 January 2022, Phillips was appointed as manager of Northern Premier League Premier Division club South Shields. Despite being favourites to win the league, South Shields finished second and lost in the play-off semi-finals to Warrington Town in Phillips' first season as manager.

International career
Between April 1999 and February 2002, Phillips made eight appearances for England but failed to score. His debut came when he was one of five international debutants selected by manager Kevin Keegan for the friendly match away to Hungary. Phillips had an opportunity to score in the first half, but his shot hit the keeper's legs. In the 74th minute, Phillips was replaced by fellow debutant Emile Heskey.

In the final warm-up match before the Euro 2000 tournament, Phillips failed to score in a 2–1 victory against Malta, with the BBC describing him as having "that slightly desperate look of all fringe players who have been left precious little time to impress". Despite this, Phillips was selected by Keegan as part of the England squad for Euro 2000, but he remained an unused substitute.

In his final appearance for England, he came on as a half-time substitute in a friendly against the Netherlands on 13 February 2002, in which he had a chance to equalise when he forced keeper Edwin van der Sar into an error;  Van der Sar then produced a point-blank save from David Beckham's follow-up.

Personal life
Phillips is married to Julie. They have four children: Millie, twins Toby and Tia, and Alfie.

Phillips' cousin-in-law is Labour politician Jess Phillips.

Career statistics

International

Managerial statistics

Honours
Sunderland
Football League First Division: 1998–99

West Bromwich Albion
Football League Championship: 2007–08

Birmingham City
Football League Cup: 2010–11
Football League Championship runner-up: 2008–09

Crystal Palace
Football League Championship play-offs: 2013

Leicester City
Football League Championship: 2013–14

Individual
Football League First Division top scorer: 1997–98
Premier League Player of the Month: October 1999
European Golden Shoe: 1999–2000
Premier League Golden Boot: 1999–2000
Premier League Player of the Year: 1999–2000
PFA Team of the Year: 1999–2000 Premier League, 2007–08 Championship
North-East FWA Player of the Year: 2000
Football League Championship Player of the Year: 2007–08
FourFourTwo 50 Best Football League Players 2008: 1st

References

External links

England profile

1973 births
Living people
Sportspeople from Hitchin
Association football forwards
English footballers
England B international footballers
England international footballers
Southampton F.C. players
Baldock Town F.C. players
Watford F.C. players
Sunderland A.F.C. players
Aston Villa F.C. players
West Bromwich Albion F.C. players
Birmingham City F.C. players
Blackpool F.C. players
Crystal Palace F.C. players
Premier League players
English Football League players
First Division/Premier League top scorers
UEFA Euro 2000 players
Leicester City F.C. players
Leicester City F.C. non-playing staff
Derby County F.C. non-playing staff
Stoke City F.C. non-playing staff
Association football coaches
English football managers
South Shields F.C. managers
Northern Premier League managers